Pannafpliakos F.C. is a Greek football club, based in Nafplion, Argolis.

The club was founded in 2011. They played in Football League 2 for the 2013-14 season.

History
Pannafpiakos G.S. founded in 1924. 1955 merged with Iraklis Pronoia which had been founded in 1929 and founded the Pannafpliakos-Iraklis G.S..
In the summer of 2011, Hellenic Football Federation approved the merger of Pannafpliakos-Iraklis G.S. with Enosi Midea F.C..
The purpose of the merger was the return of Pannafpliakos to national categories from which was far away that time.
The club emerged from the merger named Pannafpliakos F.C. 2011 / Enosi Midea.
Team colors set the red - white - green, official logo the canon.

Football clubs in Peloponnese (region)
Nafplion